O Canada is an animated television anthology series, broadcast in the United States on Cartoon Network. O Canada was the first Canadian cartoon series to air on Cartoon Network. The show also frequently aired in Canada on Teletoon, but not as much as it did in the United States on Cartoon Network.

Shown mainly on Sunday nights (early Monday mornings) at 12:00 midnight ET, O Canada featured a selection of animated shorts from Canada, mostly from the archives of the National Film Board of Canada. Some of the animated shorts featured were part of the NFB's Canada Vignettes collection of shorts first produced for CBC Television.

The title of the series originated from the name of Canada's national anthem, "O Canada".

One of the notable shorts featured in this series was Bob's Birthday, which would later serve as the basis for Comedy Central / Global Television Network's Bob and Margaret series, which would debut the following year. Despite its time slot, Bob's Birthday was censored with one scene, that featured Bob nude from the waist down, edited with a maple leaf electronically superimposed over his genitalia.

In 1997, Charles Solomon of TV Guide added this packaged series on the adult animated shows list and described it "a must for animation aficionados". Cartoon Network’s deal with NFB had since expired in 2002 in favor of Adult Swim.

Shorts shown on O Canada
The Apprentice (L'Apprenti)
Arkelope
Balablok
Begone Dull Care
The Big Snit
Blackfly
Blowhard
Bob's Birthday
Cactus Swing
The Cat Came Back
Deadly Deposits
The Dingles
Dinner for Two
Emergency Numbers
Every Child
Every Dog's Guide to Complete Home Safety
Every Dog's Guide to the Playground
Evolution
The Family That Dwelt Apart
George and Rosemary
Get a Job
Getting Started
Hot Stuff
Hunger
La Salla
The Log Driver's Waltz
The Lump
No Problem
Oh Sure
Pig Bird
Scant Sanity
Shyness
Special Delivery
Strings
The Sweater
The Tender Tale of Cinderella Penguin
To Be
Two Sisters
When the Day Breaks

Notes

References

External links 

 

National Film Board of Canada series
1990s American animated television series
2000s American animated television series
1990s American anthology television series
2000s American anthology television series
1997 American television series debuts
2002 American television series endings
1990s Canadian animated television series
2000s Canadian animated television series
1990s Canadian anthology television series
2000s Canadian anthology television series
1997 Canadian television series debuts
2002 Canadian television series endings
English-language television shows
American children's animated anthology television series
Canadian children's animated anthology television series
Lost television shows